The Sama language is the language of the Sama people of the Sulu Archipelago and the Bajau of Sabah, Malaysia.

 Sama language (Angola), a Bantu language of Angola
 Sama language (Gabon), a minor Bantu language of Gabon
 Sama–Bajaw languages, a group of languages spoken by the Bajau and Sama peoples of the Philippines, Indonesia and Malaysia
 Pangutaran Sama language, the language of the Sama people of the Sulu Archipelago

See also
 Samo language (disambiguation)
 Sara language (disambiguation)